The Basílica i Temple Expiatori de la Sagrada Família, shortened as the Sagrada Família, is an unfinished church in the Eixample district of Barcelona, Catalonia, Spain. It is the largest unfinished Catholic church in the world. Designed by the Catalan architect Antoni Gaudí (1852–1926), his work on Sagrada Família is part of a UNESCO World Heritage Site. On 7 November 2010, Pope Benedict XVI consecrated the church and proclaimed it a minor basilica.

On  19 March 1882, construction of the Sagrada Família began under architect Francisco de Paula del Villar. In 1883, when Villar resigned, Gaudí took over as chief architect, transforming the project with his architectural and engineering style, combining Gothic and curvilinear Art Nouveau forms. Gaudí devoted the remainder of his life to the project, and he is buried in the church's crypt. At the time of his death in 1926, less than a quarter of the project was complete.

Relying solely on private donations, the Sagrada Família's construction progressed slowly and was interrupted by the Spanish Civil War. In July 1936, anarchists from the FAI set fire to the crypt and broke their way into the workshop, partially destroying Gaudí's original plans. In 1939, Francesc de Paula Quintana took over site management, which was able to go on due to the material that was saved from Gaudí’s workshop and that was reconstructed from published plans and photographs. Construction resumed to intermittent progress in the 1950s. Advancements in technologies such as computer-aided design and computerised numerical control (CNC) have since enabled faster progress and construction passed the midpoint in 2010. However, some of the project's greatest challenges remain, including the construction of ten more spires, each symbolising an important Biblical figure in the New Testament. It was anticipated that the building would be completed by 2026, the centenary of Gaudí's death, but this has now been delayed due to the COVID-19 pandemic.

Describing the Sagrada Família, art critic Rainer Zerbst said "it is probably impossible to find a church building anything like it in the entire history of art", and Paul Goldberger describes it as "the most extraordinary personal interpretation of Gothic architecture since the Middle Ages". The basilica is not the cathedral church of the Archdiocese of Barcelona, as that title belongs to the Cathedral of the Holy Cross and Saint Eulalia (Barcelona Cathedral).

History

Origins
The Sagrada Família was inspired by a bookseller, founder of Asociación Espiritual de Devotos de San José (Spiritual Association of Devotees of St. Joseph). After a visit to the Vatican in 1872, Bocabella returned from Italy with the intention of building a church inspired by the basilica at Loreto. The apse crypt of the church, funded by donations, was begun 19 March 1882, on the festival of St. Joseph, to the design of the architect Francisco de Paula del Villar, whose plan was for a Gothic revival church of a standard form. The apse crypt was completed before Villar's resignation on 18 March 1883, when Antoni Gaudí assumed responsibility for its design, which he changed radically. Gaudi began work on the church in 1883 but was not appointed Architect Director until 1884.

20th century
On the subject of the extremely long construction period, Gaudí is said to have remarked: "My client is not in a hurry." When Gaudí died in 1926, the basilica was between 15 and 25 percent complete. After Gaudí's death, work continued under the direction of his main disciple Domènec Sugrañes i Gras until interrupted by the Spanish Civil War in 1936. Parts of the unfinished basilica and Gaudí's models and workshop were destroyed during the war by Catalan anarchists. The present design is based on reconstructed versions of the plans that were burned in a fire as well as on modern adaptations. Since 1940, the architects Francesc Quintana, Isidre Puig Boada, Lluís Bonet i Gari and Francesc Cardoner have carried on the work. The illumination was designed by Carles Buïgas. The director until 2012 was the son of Lluís Bonet, Jordi Bonet i Armengol. Armengol began introducing computers into the design and construction process in the 1980s.

21st century 

The central nave vaulting was completed in 2000 and the main tasks since then have been the construction of the transept vaults and apse. In 2002, the Sagrada Família Schools building was relocated from the eastern corner of the site to the southern corner, and began housing an exhibition. The school was originally designed by Gaudí in 1909 for the children of the construction workers.

, work concentrated on the crossing and supporting structure for the main steeple of Jesus Christ as well as the southern enclosure of the central nave, which will become the Glory façade. Computer-aided design technology has allowed stone to be shaped off-site by a CNC milling machine, whereas in the 20th century the stone was carved by hand. In 2008, some renowned Catalan architects advocated halting construction to respect Gaudí's original designs, which, although they were not exhaustive and were partially destroyed, have been partially reconstructed in recent years.

Since 2013, AVE high-speed trains have passed near the Sagrada Família through a tunnel that runs beneath the centre of Barcelona. The tunnel's construction, which began on 26 March 2010, was controversial. The Ministry of Public Works of Spain claimed the project posed no risk to the church. Sagrada Família engineers and architects disagreed, saying there was no guarantee that the tunnel would not affect the stability of the building. The Board of the Sagrada Família and the neighborhood association  (AVE by the Coast) led a campaign against this route for the AVE, without success. In October 2010, the tunnel boring machine reached the church underground under the location of the building's principal façade. Service through the tunnel was inaugurated on 8 January 2013. Track in the tunnel makes use of a system by Edilon Sedra in which the rails are embedded in an elastic material to dampen vibrations. No damage to the Sagrada Família has been reported to date.

The main nave was covered and an organ installed in mid-2010, allowing the still-unfinished building to be used for liturgies. The church was consecrated by Pope Benedict XVI on 7 November 2010 in front of a congregation of 6,500people. A further 50,000 people followed the consecration Mass from outside the basilica, where more than 100bishops and 300priests were on hand to distribute Holy Communion.

In 2012, Barcelona-born  took over as architect of the project. Mark Burry of New Zealand serves as Executive Architect and Researcher. Sculptures by J. Busquets, Etsuro Sotoo and the controversial Josep Maria Subirachs decorate the fantastical façades.

Chief architect Jordi Faulí announced in October 2015 that construction was 70 percent complete and had entered its final phase of raising six immense steeples. The steeples and most of the church's structure were planned be completed by 2026, the centennial of Gaudí's death; as of a 2017 estimate, decorative elements should be complete by 2030 or 2032. Visitor entrance fees of €15 to €20 finance the annual construction budget of €25million.

Starting on 9 July 2017, an international mass is celebrated at the basilica every Sunday and holy day of obligation, at 9a.m., and is open to the public (until the church is full). Occasionally, Mass is celebrated at other times, where attendance requires an invitation. When masses are scheduled, instructions to obtain an invitation are posted on the basilica's website. In addition, visitors may pray in the chapel of the Blessed Sacrament and Penitence.

In 2018, the stone type needed for the construction was found in a quarry in Brinscall, near Chorley, England.

Incidents 
On 19 April 2011, an arsonist started a small fire in the sacristy which forced the evacuation of tourists and construction workers. The sacristy was damaged, and the fire took 45 minutes to contain.

On 11 March 2020, due to the COVID-19 pandemic in Spain, construction temporarily stopped and the basilica was closed. This was the first time the construction had been halted since the Spanish Civil War. The Gaudí House Museum in Park Güell was also closed. The basilica reopened, initially to key workers, on 4 July 2020.

On 29 November 2021, a  twelve-pointed illuminated crystal star was installed on one of the main towers of the basilica dedicated to the Virgin Mary. There were concerns about plans to build a large stairway leading up to the basilica's main entrance, unfinished at the time, which could require the demolition of three city blocks, the homes to 1,000 people as well as some businesses.

Design

The style of the Sagrada Família is variously likened to Spanish Late Gothic, Catalan Modernism or Art Nouveau. While the Sagrada Família falls within the Art Nouveau period, Nikolaus Pevsner points out that, along with Charles Rennie Mackintosh in Glasgow, Gaudí carried the Art Nouveau style far beyond its usual application as a surface decoration.

Plan
While never a cathedral, the Sagrada Família was planned from the outset to be a large building, comparable in size to a cathedral. Its ground-plan has obvious links to earlier Spanish cathedrals such as Burgos Cathedral, León Cathedral and Seville Cathedral. In common with Catalan and many other European Gothic cathedrals, the Sagrada Família is short in comparison to its width, and has a great complexity of parts, which include double aisles, an ambulatory with a chevet of seven apsidal chapels, a multitude of steeples and three portals, each widely different in structure as well as ornament. Where it is common for cathedrals in Spain to be surrounded by numerous chapels and ecclesiastical buildings, the plan of the Sagrada Família has an unusual feature: a covered passage or cloister which forms a rectangle enclosing the church and passing through the narthex of each of its three portals. With this peculiarity aside, the plan, influenced by Villar's crypt, barely hints at the complexity of Gaudí's design or its deviations from traditional church architecture. There are no exact right angles to be seen inside or outside the church, and few straight lines in the design.

Spires

Gaudí's original design calls for a total of eighteen spires, representing in ascending order of height the Twelve Apostles, the Virgin Mary, the four Evangelists and, tallest of all, Jesus Christ. Eleven spires have been built , corresponding to four apostles at the Nativity façade and four apostles at the Passion façade, two of the evangelists Luke and Mark, and the Virgin Mary.

According to the 2005 "Works Report" of the project's official website, drawings signed by Gaudí and recently found in the Municipal Archives, indicate that the spire of the Virgin was in fact intended by Gaudí to be shorter than those of the evangelists. The spire height will follow Gaudí's intention, which according to the report will work with the existing foundation.

The Evangelists' spires will be surmounted by sculptures of their traditional symbols: a winged bull (Saint Luke), a winged man (Saint Matthew), an eagle (Saint John), and a winged lion (Saint Mark). The central spire of Jesus Christ is to be surmounted by a giant cross; its total height will be less than that of Montjuïc hill in Barcelona, as Gaudí believed that his creation should not surpass God's. The lower spires are surmounted by communion hosts with sheaves of wheat and chalices with bunches of grapes, representing the Eucharist. Plans call for tubular bells to be placed within the spires, driven by the force of the wind, and driving sound down into the interior of the church. Gaudí performed acoustic studies to achieve the appropriate acoustic results inside the temple. However, only one bell is currently in place.

Façades

The Church is designed to have three grand façades: the Nativity façade to the East, the Passion façade to the West, and the Glory façade to the South (yet to be completed). 

The Nativity Façade was built before work was interrupted in 1935 and bears the most direct Gaudí influence.

The Passion façade was built according to the design that Gaudi created in 1917. The construction began in 1954, and the steeples, built over the elliptical plan, were finished in 1976. It is especially striking for its spare, gaunt, tormented characters, including emaciated figures of Christ being scourged at the pillar; and Christ on the Cross. These controversial designs are the work of Josep Maria Subirachs. 

The Glory façade, on which construction began in 2002, will be the largest and most monumental of the three and will represent one's ascension to God. It will also depict various scenes such as Hell, Purgatory, and will include elements such as the seven deadly sins and the seven heavenly virtues.

Nativity Façade

Constructed between 1893 and 1936, the Nativity façade was the first façade to be completed. Dedicated to the birth of Jesus, it is decorated with scenes reminiscent of elements of life. Characteristic of Gaudí's naturalistic style, the sculptures are ornately arranged and decorated with scenes and images from nature, each a symbol in its own manner. For instance, the three porticos are separated by two large columns, and at the base of each lies a turtle or a tortoise (one to represent the land and the other the sea; each are symbols of time as something set in stone and unchangeable). In contrast to the figures of turtles and their symbolism, two chameleons can be found at either side of the façade, and are symbolic of change.

The façade faces the rising sun to the northeast, a symbol for the birth of Christ. It is divided into three porticos, each of which represents a theological virtue (Hope, Faith and Charity). The Tree of Life rises above the door of Jesus in the portico of Charity. Four steeples complete the façade and are each dedicated to a Saint (Matthias, Barnabas, Jude the Apostle, and Simon the Zealot).

Originally, Gaudí intended for this façade to be polychromed, for each archivolt to be painted with a wide array of colours. He wanted every statue and figure to be painted. In this way the figures of humans would appear as much alive as the figures of plants and animals.

Gaudí chose this façade to embody the structure and decoration of the whole church. He was well aware that he would not finish the church and that he would need to set an artistic and architectural example for others to follow. He also chose for this façade to be the first on which to begin construction and for it to be, in his opinion, the most attractive and accessible to the public. He believed that if he had begun construction with the Passion Façade, one that would be hard and bare (as if made of bones), before the Nativity Façade, people would have withdrawn at the sight of it. Some of the statues were destroyed in 1936 during the Spanish Civil War, and subsequently were reconstructed by the Japanese artist Etsuro Sotoo.

Passion Façade

In contrast to the highly decorated Nativity Façade, the Passion Façade is austere, plain and simple, with ample bare stone, and is carved with harsh straight lines to resemble the bones of a skeleton. Dedicated to the Passion of Christ, the suffering of Jesus during his crucifixion, the façade was intended to portray the sins of man. Construction began in 1954, following the drawings and instructions left by Gaudí for future architects and sculptors. The steeples were completed in 1976, and in 1987 a team of sculptors, headed by Josep Maria Subirachs, began work sculpting the various scenes and details of the façade. They aimed to give a rigid, angular form to provoke a dramatic effect. Gaudí intended for this façade to strike fear into the onlooker. He wanted to "break" arcs and "cut" columns, and to use the effect of chiaroscuro (dark angular shadows contrasted by harsh rigid light) to further show the severity and brutality of Christ's sacrifice.

Facing the setting sun, indicative and symbolic of the death of Christ, the Passion Façade is supported by six large and inclined columns, designed to resemble strained muscles. Above there is a pyramidal pediment, made up of eighteen bone-shaped columns, which culminate in a large cross with a crown of thorns. Each of the four steeples is dedicated to an apostle (James, Thomas, Philip, and Bartholomew) and, like the Nativity Façade, there are three porticos, each representing the theological virtues, though in a much different light.

The scenes sculpted into the façade may be divided into three levels, which ascend in an S form and reproduce the stations of the cross (Via Crucis of Christ). The lowest level depicts scenes from Jesus' last night before the crucifixion, including the Last Supper, Kiss of Judas, Ecce homo, and the Sanhedrin trial of Jesus. The middle level portrays the Calvary, or Golgotha, of Christ, and includes The Three Marys, Saint Longinus, Saint Veronica, and a hollow-face illusion of Christ on the Veil of Veronica. In the third and final level the Death, Burial and the Resurrection of Christ can be seen. A bronze figure situated on a bridge creating a link between the steeples of Saint Bartholomew and Saint Thomas represents the Ascension of Jesus.

The façade contains a magic square based on the magic square in the 1514 print Melencolia I. The square is rotated and one number in each row and column is reduced by one so the rows and columns add up to 33 instead of the standard 34 for a 4x4 magic square.

Glory Façade

The largest and most striking of the façades will be the Glory Façade, on which construction began in 2002. It will be the principal façade and will offer access to the central nave. Dedicated to the Celestial Glory of Jesus, it represents the road to God: Death, Final Judgment, and Glory, while Hell is left for those who deviate from God's will. Aware that he would not live long enough to see this façade completed, Gaudí made a model which was demolished in 1936, whose original fragments were used as the basis for the development of the design for the façade. The completion of this façade may require the partial demolition of the block with buildings across the Carrer de Mallorca. The decision should be proposed in May 2023.

To reach the Glory Portico the large staircase will lead over the underground passage built over Carrer de Mallorca with the decoration representing Hell and vice. On other projects Carrer de Mallorca will have to go underground. It will be decorated with demons, idols, false gods, heresy and schisms, etc. Purgatory and death will also be depicted, the latter using tombs along the ground. The portico will have seven large columns dedicated to gifts of the Holy Spirit. At the base of the columns there will be representations of the seven deadly sins, and at the top, the seven heavenly virtues.
 Gifts: wisdom, understanding, counsel, fortitude, knowledge, piety and fear of the Lord.
 Sins: greed, lust, pride, gluttony, sloth, wrath, envy.
 Virtues: kindness, diligence, patience, charity, temperance, humility, chastity.

This facade will have five doors corresponding to the five naves of the temple, with the central one having a triple entrance, that will give the Glory Façade a total seven doors representing the sacraments:
 Baptism
 Confirmation
 Eucharist
 Penance
 Holy orders
 Marriage
 Anointing of the sick

In September 2008, the doors of the Glory façade, by Subirachs, were installed. Inscribed with the words of the Our Father, these central doors are inscribed with the words "Give us our daily bread" in fifty different languages. The handles of the door are the letters "A" and "G" that form the initials of Antoni Gaudí within the phrase "lead us not into temptation".

Interior

The church plan is that of a Latin cross with five aisles. The central nave vaults reach  while the side nave vaults reach . The transept has three aisles. The columns are on a  grid. However, the columns of the apse, resting on del Villar's foundation, do not adhere to the grid, requiring a section of columns of the ambulatory to transition to the grid thus creating a horseshoe pattern to the layout of those columns. The crossing rests on the four central columns of porphyry supporting a great hyperboloid surrounded by two rings of twelve hyperboloids (currently under construction). The central vault reaches . The apse is capped by a hyperboloid vault reaching . Gaudí intended that a visitor standing at the main entrance be able to see the vaults of the nave, crossing, and apse; thus the graduated increase in vault loft.

There are gaps in the floor of the apse, providing a view down into the crypt below.

The columns of the interior are a unique Gaudí design. Besides branching to support their load, their ever-changing surfaces are the result of the intersection of various geometric forms. The simplest example is that of a square base evolving into an octagon as the column rises, then a sixteen-sided form, and eventually to a circle. This effect is the result of a three-dimensional intersection of helicoidal columns (for example a square cross-section column twisting clockwise and a similar one twisting counter-clockwise).

Essentially none of the interior surfaces are flat; the ornamentation is comprehensive and rich, consisting in large part of abstract shapes which combine smooth curves and jagged points. Even detail-level work such as the iron railings for balconies and stairways are full of curvaceous elaboration.

Organ
In 2010 an organ was installed in the chancel by the Blancafort Orgueners de Montserrat organ builders. The instrument has 26 stops (1,492 pipes) on two manuals and a pedalboard.

To overcome the unique acoustical challenges posed by the church's architecture and vast size, several additional organs will be installed at various points within the building. These instruments will be playable separately (from their own individual consoles) and simultaneously (from a single mobile console), yielding an organ of some 8,000 pipes when completed.

Geometric details

The steeples on the Nativity façade are crowned with geometrically shaped tops that are reminiscent of Cubism (they were finished around 1930), and the intricate decoration is contemporary to the style of Art Nouveau, but Gaudí's unique style drew primarily from nature, not other artists or architects, and resists categorization.

Gaudí used hyperboloid structures in later designs of the Sagrada Família (more obviously after 1914). However, there are a few places on the nativity façade—a design not equated with Gaudí's ruled-surface design—where the hyperboloid crops up. For example, all around the scene with the pelican, there are numerous examples (including the basket held by one of the figures). There is a hyperboloid adding structural stability to the cypress tree (by connecting it to the bridge). Finally, the "bishop's mitre" spires are capped with hyperboloid structures. In his later designs, ruled surfaces are prominent in the nave's vaults and windows and the surfaces of the Passion Façade.

Symbolism

Themes throughout the decoration include words from the liturgy. The steeples are decorated with words such as "Hosanna", "Excelsis", and "Sanctus"; the great doors of the Passion façade reproduce excerpts of the Passion of Jesus from the New Testament in various languages, mainly Catalan; and the Glory façade is to be decorated with the words from the Apostles' Creed, while its main door reproduce the entire Lord's Prayer in Catalan, surrounded by multiple variations of "Give us this day our daily bread" in other languages. The three entrances symbolize the three virtues: Faith, Hope and Love. Each of them is also dedicated to a part of Christ's life. The Nativity Façade is dedicated to his birth; it also has a cypress tree which symbolizes the tree of life. The Glory Façade is dedicated to his glory period. The Passion Façade is symbolic of his suffering. The apse steeple bears Latin text of Hail Mary.

Areas of the sanctuary will be designated to represent various concepts, such as saints, virtues and sins, and secular concepts such as regions, presumably with decoration to match.

Burials
 Josep Maria Bocabella
 Antoni Gaudí

Appraisal
The art historian Nikolaus Pevsner, writing in the 1960s, referred to Gaudí's buildings as growing "like sugar loaves and anthills" and describes the ornamenting of buildings with shards of broken pottery as possibly "bad taste" but handled with vitality and "ruthless audacity".

The building's design itself has been polarizing. Assessments by Gaudí's fellow architects were generally positive; Louis Sullivan greatly admired it, describing Sagrada Família as the "greatest piece of creative architecture in the last twenty-five years. It is spirit symbolised in stone!" Walter Gropius praised the Sagrada Família, describing the building's walls as "a marvel of technical perfection". Time magazine called it "sensual, spiritual, whimsical, exuberant". However, author and critic George Orwell called it "one of the most hideous buildings in the world", author James A. Michener called it "one of the strangest-looking serious buildings in the world" and British historian Gerald Brenan stated about the building "Not even in the European architecture of the period can one discover anything so vulgar or pretentious." The building's distinctive silhouette has nevertheless become symbolic of Barcelona itself, drawing an estimated 3 million visitors annually.

World Heritage status
Together with six other Gaudí buildings in Barcelona, part of la Sagrada Família is a UNESCO World Heritage Site, as testifying "to Gaudí's exceptional creative contribution to the development of architecture and building technology", "having represented el Modernisme of Catalonia" and "anticipated and influenced many of the forms and techniques that were relevant to the development of modern construction in the 20th century". The inscription only includes the Crypt and the Nativity Façade.

Visitor access
Visitors can access the Nave, Crypt, Museum, Shop, and the Passion and Nativity steeples. Entrance to either of the steeples requires a reservation and advance purchase of a ticket. Access is possible only by lift (elevator) and a short walk up the remainder of the steeples to the bridge between the steeples. Descent is via a very narrow spiral staircase of over 300 steps. There is a posted caution for those with medical conditions.

As of June 2017, online ticket purchase has been available. As of August 2010, there had been a service whereby visitors could buy an entry code either at Servicaixa ATM kiosks (part of CaixaBank) or online. During the peak season, May to October, reservation delays for entrance of up to a few days are not unusual.

International masses 
The Archdiocese of Barcelona holds an international mass at the Basilica of the Sagrada Família every Sunday and on holy days of obligation.
 Date and time: Every Sunday and on holy days of obligation at 9am.
 There is no charge for attending mass but capacity is limited
 Visitors are asked to dress appropriately and behave respectfully.

Funding and building permit
Construction on Sagrada Família is not supported by any government or official church sources. Private patrons funded the initial stages. Money from tickets purchased by tourists is now used to pay for the work, and private donations are accepted through the Friends of the Sagrada Família.

The construction budget for 2009 was €18 million.

In October 2018, Sagrada Família trustees agreed to pay city authorities €36 million for a building permit, after 136 years of unlicensed construction. Most of the funds would be directed to improve the access between the church and the Barcelona Metro. The permit was issued by the city on 7 June 2019.

See also
 List of Catholic basilicas
 List of Gaudí buildings
 List of Modernista buildings in Barcelona
 Sagrada Família (Barcelona Metro)
 Pantheon, Rome

Notes

References

Bibliography

Further reading

External links

 
 Gaudí, Sagrada Família  (video), Smarthistory

Antoni Gaudí buildings
Art Nouveau church buildings in Spain
Articles containing video clips
Basilica churches in Spain
Bien de Interés Cultural landmarks in the Province of Barcelona
Buildings and structures under construction in Spain
Eixample
Hyperboloid structures
Mathematics and art
Modernisme architecture in Barcelona
Roman Catholic churches in Barcelona
Skyscrapers in Barcelona
Tourist attractions in Barcelona
Visionary environments
Votive churches
World Heritage Sites in Catalonia